Sheldon–Owens Farm is a national historic district located at Willsboro in Essex County, New York. The district contains seven contributing buildings, one contributing site, and seven contributing structures.  They are set on a property assembled between 1784 and 1945.  The oldest structure is a barn dated to the late 18th century.  A number of the outbuildings date to the 1830s and include barns, a granary, brick smokehouse, and sugar house.  The farmhouse dates to 1853 and was constructed on the foundation of the 18th-century house.  Dated to the early 20th century are a storage shed, machine shed, well house, and additions and renovations to older buildings.  The property has been adapted for use as a bird sanctuary.

It was listed on the National Register of Historic Places in 1993.

References

Farms on the National Register of Historic Places in New York (state)
Historic districts on the National Register of Historic Places in New York (state)
National Register of Historic Places in Essex County, New York